Edurinti Mogudu Pakkinti Pellam   is a 1991 Indian Telugu-language comedy film directed by Relangi Narasimha Rao. It stars Rajendra Prasad, Divyavani  and music composed by J. V. Raghavulu. It was produced by Battina Venkatakrishna Reddy under the Sri Sai Madhavi Arts banner. Relangi Narasimha Rao later remade the film in Kannada as Edurmaneli Ganda Pakkadmaneli Hendthi (1992).

Plot
Badhalabandee Vara Prasad, alias Bava, is a miser, and his wife Jayalakshmi (Divyavani) is a spendthrift. Jaya is not able to tolerate her husband's stingy attitude and leaves the house when she is pregnant. After seven years, she comes and joins for rent at her husband's side house along with the child Sridhar (Master Baladitya). The child gets all the hereditary stingy qualities of his father and Sridhar gets closer to Bava gradually.

Knowing this, Jaya leaves the colony, after that Bava's mother (Annapurna), who was angry with him because of his marriage against her will, gets to know he has left his wife. She joins as a maid in Jaya's house to spend time with Jaya and her grandson. After some time, Jaya gets to know that the maid is none other than her mother-in-law and feels bad for treating her as a maid.

Bava and Jaya's boss Usha Singhal (Y. Vijaya), who is a kind-hearted lady plot a drama in that Bava has a brain tumour because of which his view towards money and family changes and unites him with his wife, mother, and child. At last, Usha Singhal reveals that she has used a fake x-ray to bring change in Bava's attitude and the movie ends on a happy note.

Cast
Rajendra Prasad as Badhalabandee Vara Prasad / Bava
Divyavani as Jayalakshmi
Suthi Velu as Subbayya Lingam
Mallikarjuna Rao as Pullayya
Babu Mohan as peon Appa Rao
Raavi Kondala Rao as Manager 
Kaasi Vishwanath as Doctor
Annapurna as Bava's mother
Sri Lakshmi as writer Srivani
Suryakala as Bala Kumari / Baku
Y. Vijaya as Municipal Commissioner Usha Singhal
Master Baladitya as Sridhar

Soundtrack

Music composed by J. V. Raghavulu. Music released on Surya Music Company.

Other
 VCDs and DVDs on - SHALIMAR Video Company, Hyderabad

References

External links
 

Indian comedy films
1991 films
Films scored by J. V. Raghavulu
Telugu films remade in other languages
1990s Telugu-language films
1991 comedy films
Films directed by Relangi Narasimha Rao